Ika Ika are found in both Delta State and Edo State.

They share major cultural affinities with the Igbo people and minor affinities with the Bini people.

Prominent Ika people
Jim Ovia: Nigerian business man, founder of Zenith Bank
 Godwin Emefiele: Governor, Central Bank of Nigeria (CBN) 2015–Present
Lucky Irabor: Chief of Defence Staff, Nigeria
Ifeanyi Okowa: Delta State Governor 2015-till date
Dumebi Iyamah: Owner of the “Andrea Iyamah” International Fashion Brand
Somkele Iyamah: Model, Movie Star, Director & Producer
Sam Obi: Former Acting Governor and former Speaker, Delta State House of Assembly
Nduka Obaigbena: Chairman & Editor-in-Chief of the THISDAY Media Group and ARISE News Channel.
Lisa Omorodion: Nollywood Actress, producer and entrepreneur .
 Hanks Anuku: Nollywood Actor.

References 

Ika people
Ethnic groups in Nigeria
Igbo people